Glenea cantor is a species of beetle in the family Cerambycidae. It was described by Johan Christian Fabricius in 1787. It is known from the Philippines, Cambodia, Laos, Hong Kong, India, Bangladesh, Thailand, China, and Vietnam.

Subspecies
 Glenea cantor cantor (Fabricius, 1787)
 Glenea cantor luzonica Aurivillius, 1926
 Glenea cantor obesa (Thomson, 1857)

References

cantor
Beetles described in 1787